Johnson Evan Gicheru (died 25 December 2020) was a Kenyan lawyer and a Chief Justice of Kenya. He was appointed by President Mwai Kibaki upon his election in 2003. He was the 12th Chief Justice of the Republic of Kenya and served the longest term by any African Chief Justice in Kenya's history, from 2003 and finally retiring on 27 February 2011. He died on 25 December 2020.

Early career
Early in his career, he worked as a Senior State Counsel in the Office of the Attorney General and as an administrative officer in the Office of the President.
Justice Gicheru was appointed a Judge of the High Court in 1982 and on 8 June 1988 he was appointed to the Court of Appeal. During this time he was appointed chairperson of a judicial inquiry into the death of Foreign Affairs Minister Robert Ouko. The commission was disbanded before publishing its findings. His tenure as Chief Justice began on February 21, 2003.

Personal life
Mr. Justice Gicheru was married to Mrs. Margaret Gicheru and they had 7 children.

See also
 Chief Justice of Kenya
 Court of Appeal of Kenya
 High Court of Kenya

References

Year of birth missing
2020 deaths
20th-century Kenyan judges
21st-century Kenyan judges
Chief justices of Kenya